Central Connect Airlines (CCA) was an airline based in Ostrava, Czech Republic. It operated leasing and charter services. Its main base was Leoš Janáček Airport Ostrava.

History
The airline was established in 2005, was wholly owned by the Central Connect Group (CCG) and had 110 employees as of December 2008.

In February 2012 the airline retired their last Saab 340F.

On 18 June 2012 Central Connect Airlines ceased its regular operations due to financial difficulties. The airline served routes from Prague to Berlin, Stuttgart, Hanover, Ljubljana, Kraków and Zagreb in cooperation with Czech Airlines. The routes were first taken over by the end of March 2012 from Czech Airlines. There were plans to reorganize the company.

As of December 2013 Central Connect Airlines operated leasing and charter services but didn't resume the scheduled routes for Czech Airlines.

In June 2014 it was announced that Central Connect Airlines would cease all remaining operations by 30 June 2014.

Destinations

Operated for Air100

Helsinki – Helsinki Airport (ended 30 June 2014)
Pori – Pori Airport (ended 30 June 2014)

Operated in partnership with Czech Airlines
Central Connect Airlines served the following destinations :

Ostrava – Leoš Janáček Airport Ostrava base (ceased 18 June 2012)
Prague – Prague Ruzyně Airport (ceased 18 June 2012)

Berlin - Berlin Tegel Airport (ceased 18 June 2012)
Hannover Airport (ceased 18 June 2012)
Stuttgart Airport (ceased 18 June 2012)

Ljubljana – Ljubljana Jože Pučnik Airport (ceased 18 June 2012)

Kraków – John Paul II International Airport (ceased 18 June 2012)
Poznań – Poznań-Ławica Airport (ceased 18 June 2012)

Zagreb – Zagreb Airport (ceased 18 June 2012)

Fleet
The Central Connect Airlines fleet included the following aircraft:

2 Saab 340B

References

External links

Defunct airlines of the Czech Republic
Airlines established in 2005
Airlines disestablished in 2014
2014 disestablishments in the Czech Republic
Czech companies established in 2005